The Granny Smith Gold Mine is a gold mine  south of Laverton, Western Australia near Mount Weld and operated by Gold Fields.

As of 2022, it is one of four mines the company operates in Australia, the others being the Agnew Gold Mine, St Ives Gold Mine and the Gruyere Gold Mine.

History

The Granny Smith gold deposit was discovered in 1979 by Canadian prospector Ray Lovi Smith and named after his wife Laurende.

Construction of the mine took place in the late 1980s.

The project was originally owned by Delta Gold Ltd, which became Auriongold Ltd in February 2002. Aurion was taken over by Placer Dome Inc in 2003, who already held a 60% interest in the mine, and Placer Dome in turn by Barrick Gold in March 2006.

Open pit mining at Wallaby ceased in September 2006, followed by a ramp up of underground mining at the location.

In February 2009, Barrick signed a memorandum of understanding with Crescent Gold to purchase ore from their Laverton Gold Mine and mill it at Granny Smith. In January 2010, an agreement was signed with Range River Gold to purchase ore from the Mount Morgans Gold Mine and treat it at Granny Smith from February 2010 onwards.

In October 2013, Barrick finalised the sale of their Australian Yilgarn South mines, consisting of the Granny Smith, Lawlers and Darlot mines to Goldfields. Barrick sold the mines as it considered them high-cost and required cash to compensate for the rising cost of its Pascua-Lama gold project. The three mines accounted for six percent of Barrick's annual gold output at the time. Goldfields purchased the mines for US$300 million, half of which had to be paid in cash while the other half could be issued in shares.

Environment
In 1999, abandoned mining pits at Granny Smith were used for trials on breeding silver perch and barramundi in salty water.

Production

Granny Smith
Production of the mine as an individual entity:

Yilgarn South
Production figures for the Yilgarn South operation, consisting of Darlot, Granny Smith and Lawlers:

Granny Smith
Production of the mine as an individual operation again:

References

Bibliography

External links 

 
 MINEDEX website: Granny Smith Database of the Department of Mines, Industry Regulation and Safety

Gold mines in Western Australia
Surface mines in Australia
Underground mines in Australia
Shire of Laverton
Barrick Gold
Gold Fields